Pogogul Airport  is an airport near Buol, a city in the province of Central Sulawesi on the island of Sulawesi in Indonesia.

Facilities

Airlines and destinations

References

Airports in Central Sulawesi